Two-storeyed caravanserai or Gasim bey caravanserai is a historic monument of the XV century. It is a part of Old City and located on Hagigat Rzayeva street, in the city of Baku, in Azerbaijan. The building was also registered as a national architectural monument by the decision of the Cabinet of Ministers of the Republic of Azerbaijan dated August 2, 2001, No. 132.

History
The caravanserai was constructed in the XV century. According to the sources, it was built by Shirvan Khalilullah I and was used by Gasim bey and his followers.

Architectural features
There are two-sided open entries of the caravanserai placed on the same axis. Entrance to the caravanserai is possible with offshore streets related with sea trade and with a part where trade highway located. It is in square form by its interior structure plan.

Internal area of the caravanserai is octahedral and it consists of a yard which is surrounded by balconies, where several rooms are located. Covers of rooms and domes of balconies are in pointed form. The rooms in the corner are completed with little domes. Entrances to the monument are finished with portals bulging at height of the caravanserai and with deep niches at the level of the first floor. The caravanserai is protected from southeast side with whole corner towers. It also shows its defensive characteristics in the system of city walls.

Gallery

See also
Small Caravanserai

References

 Caravanserais in Azerbaijan
Buildings and structures completed in the 15th century
 Azerbaijani culture
 Tourist attractions in Baku
Tourist attractions in Azerbaijan
Icherisheher